Daniel Peinado is a retired Argentine association football player.  He played professionally in Argentina, Columbia and Major League Soccer.

In 1986, Peinado began his career with Estudiantes de la Plata in 1986. In 1993, he moved to Club Atlético Lanús.  In 1996, he went on loan to América de Cali.  On January 23, 1997, Major League Soccer signed Peinado and assigned him to the Dallas Burn.  On April 26, 1997, Peinado set an MLS record when he committed nine fouls in one half against the Los Angeles Galaxy.

He is a manager for Club Sportivo Independiente.

References

External links
 

Living people
1967 births
América de Cali footballers
Argentine footballers
Argentine expatriate footballers
Argentine expatriate sportspeople in the United States
Association football defenders
FC Dallas players
Estudiantes de La Plata footballers
Club Atlético Lanús footballers
Major League Soccer players